Bogoljub Ilić (Serbian Cyrillic: Богољуб Илић; 22 February 1881 – 23 April 1965) was a Serbian Armijski đeneral with the Royal Yugoslav Army who was briefly Minister for the Army and Navy prior and during the German-led Axis invasion of Yugoslavia in April 1941. He was then Minister of the Army and Navy in exile from August 1941 to January 1942.

Career
Milovanović was born in Požarevac, Serbia in 1881. He was commissioned in 1900 and held several staff positions during the Balkan Wars and World War I. He was promoted to brigadni đeneral in 1925, after which he served in a variety of appointments, including chief of staff of the 5th Army, commander of the 1st Cavalry Division, and 2nd Deputy Chief of the General Staff. In September 1936, he was appointed to command the 2nd Army at Sarajevo.

Notes

Footnotes

References

Books

Websites
 

1881 births
1956 deaths
Military personnel from Požarevac
Royal Serbian Army soldiers
Serbian military personnel of World War I
20th-century Serbian people
Serbian generals
People of the Kingdom of Yugoslavia
Royal Yugoslav Army personnel of World War II